Tyler Johnson (born July 29, 1990) is an American professional ice hockey player currently playing for the Chicago Blackhawks of the National Hockey League (NHL). Johnson won back-to-back Stanley Cup championships with the Tampa Bay Lightning in 2020 and 2021.

Playing career

Junior
Johnson was selected by the Spokane Chiefs with their 11th-round pick in the 2005 WHL Bantam Draft. In his first season with this team, in 2007–08, he appeared in 69 regular season games, scoring 13 goals and 29 assists. The Chiefs won the Ed Chynoweth Cup that season as the league's champions. The Chiefs subsequently earned a berth in the 2008 Memorial Cup, where they defeated the Kitchener Rangers by a score of 4–1. Johnson played in all 21 playoff games, scoring five goals and adding three assists. He was named the WHL playoffs' Most Valuable Player as a 17-year-old rookie.

In the 2008–09 season, he played in 62 games, scoring 26 goals and 35 assists for 61 points and adding another five goals and three assists in 12 playoff games. The 2009–10 season saw Johnson's numbers improve, as he tallied 36 goals and 35 assists in 64 games. He also added three goals and five assists in seven playoff games.
 
Johnson's 2010–11 season proved to be his best yet as he became the 15th Chiefs' member of all-time to hit the century mark (100 points), with 53 goals and 62 assists, making him the leading goal scorer and second-leading points scorer in the WHL. He ultimately finished the season with career highs in goals (53), assists (62) and points (115), while also leading the team in power play and shorthanded goals and ranking third with a plus-27 ranking. He was named Player of the Month for the WHL for December 2010. He was also voted as the Best Overage Player, Top Defensive Forward, Best Skater, and Top Faceoff Man, second in Most Valuable to Team, and third in Most Accurate Shot in the Best of the West 2011 poll.

Tampa Bay Lightning
Johnson signed a three-year entry-level contract with the Tampa Bay Lightning in March 2011. Johnson's smaller size is known to be the reason he went undrafted.

Johnson played the 2011–12 season with the Norfolk Admirals, the Lightning's top American Hockey League (AHL) affiliate. In March, he went on a 13-game scoring streak, including back-to-back two goal games, the longest streak by an AHL rookie in more than six years. This streak helped him earn the Reebok/AHL Player of the Month award for March 2012. Tyler Johnson was a key player in the Norfolk Admirals record winning streak of 28 games, which is a professional hockey league record. He was also a key player in Norfolk's first ever Calder Cup that Season.

In the 2012–13 season, Johnson would play the majority his time with Lightning's new AHL affiliate, the Syracuse Crunch. He would go on to lead the AHL in goals scored and named the regular season MVP. At the end of the season he was awarded the President's Award for outstanding accomplishments on the ice. Johnson and the Syracuse Crunch went on to go to the finals and would eventually lose to the Grand Rapids Griffins On March 14, 2013, he was called up by the Lightning and made his NHL debut against the New York Islanders. He would score his first NHL goal in his second game on March 16 against the Carolina Hurricanes.

In his rookie NHL season with the Lightning in 2013–14, Johnson established himself on Tampa Bay's top offensive line and finished the season with 24 goals and 26 assists for 50 points in 82 games. He was selected as a NHL Calder Memorial Trophy nominee for the league's top rookie. The trophy, however, eventually went to Nathan MacKinnon of the Colorado Avalanche, though Johnson was named to the NHL All-Rookie Team.

The following season, 2014–15, Johnson followed up his breakout season in the NHL by scoring 29 goals and 43 assists for a total of 72 points in 77 games with the Lightning, finishing 15th overall in points in the League. He also finished third in the NHL in plus-minus rating of +33 for the season, also being chosen for the 2014–15 NHL All-Star Game. On April 27, 2015, during the 2015 Stanley Cup playoffs, Johnson became the first player in Lightning history to record three multi-goal games in a single playoff series. He also tied Ruslan Fedotenko for the Lightning single series goals record, with six. On May 20, 2015, Johnson tied Ruslan Fedotenko for most post-season goals in Lightning history. On May 18, Johnson became the first Lightning player to score a hat-trick in the playoffs, as well as the first to score a short-handed and power play goal in a single playoff period. He also set the Lightning multi-goal game record for the playoffs with his fourth of the 2015 playoffs. On June 6, Johnson scored his 13th goal of the playoffs, the highest output in a single playoff year by a Tampa Bay player. Early in the 2015 Stanley Cup Finals, Johnson suffered a broken wrist, but he continued to play through the injury. However, this prevented him from taking faceoffs, and limited his production to just one goal.

On November 15, 2016, Johnson recorded his 100th career NHL assist. The assist came in a 4–3 Lightning win against the Detroit Red Wings at Joe Louis Arena. On February 19, 2017, Johnson recorded his 200th career NHL point against the Dallas Stars at American Airlines Center. On February 23, 2017, Johnson played in 300th career NHL game.

On July 10, 2017, Johnson signed a seven-year, $35 million contract extension with the Lightning, worth $5 million annually. On October 24, 2017, Johnson recorded his 93rd career goal in a Lightning uniform, which moved him past Ryan Malone for 10th most goals in franchise history. The goal came in a 5–1 Lightning win over the Carolina Hurricanes at PNC Arena. On December 29, 2017, Johnson recorded his 99th career NHL goal, which moved him past Chris Gratton for 9th most goals in Lightning history. On December 31, 2017, Johnson recorded his 100th career NHL goal in a 5–0 win over the Columbus Blue Jackets at Nationwide Arena. On March 22, 2018, Johnson recorded his 260th career NHL point. The point moved Johnson past Chris Gratton for 10th most points in Lightning history. On October 16, 2018, Johnson recorded his 4th career regular season hat trick to help the Lightning to a 4–2 win over the visiting Carolina Hurricanes. Johnson's second goal of the night moved him past Brian Bradley for 8th most goals in franchise history with 112. On December 29, 2018, Johnson scored his 128th goal to move past Vaclav Prospal for 7th most goals in Lightning history.

On December 28, 2019, Johnson skated in his 500th career NHL game. On January 29, 2020, Johnson recorded his 151st career NHL goal to move past Brad Richards for 5th all time in Lightning history.

On September 28, 2020, Johnson became the first Spokane area native to win the Stanley Cup, as the Lightning defeated the Dallas Stars 4-2 in the Stanley Cup Finals.

Chicago Blackhawks
On July 27, 2021, Johnson was traded to the Chicago Blackhawks, along with a second-round pick in 2023, in exchange for the contract of Brent Seabrook. Johnson missed much of 2021–22 campaign after sustaining a neck injury that required surgery and later suffering a concussion. He appeared in only 26 games for the Blackhawks, tallying only three goals and four assists, while maintaining a 60.8 faceoff percentage.

International play

Johnson has also excelled in international competition, helping the United States to the gold medal at the 2010 World Junior Championships in Canada, recording three goals and five points with a plus-4 rating in seven games. He was named player of the game in their first-round game against Canada.

Personal life
Tyler Johnson grew up in the Spokane suburb of Liberty Lake, Washington, where he graduated from Central Valley High School with honors. His parents, Ken and Debbie Johnson, met playing a rec-league hockey game at Spokane’s Eagle’s Ice-A-Rena. His mother Debbie was a skating coach who taught Tyler how to skate.

Career statistics

Regular season and playoffs
Bold indicates led league

International

Awards and honors

References

External links

1990 births
Living people
American men's ice hockey centers
Chicago Blackhawks players
Ice hockey people from Washington (state)
National Hockey League All-Stars
Norfolk Admirals players
Spokane Chiefs players
Sportspeople from Spokane, Washington
Stanley Cup champions
Syracuse Crunch players
Tampa Bay Lightning players
Undrafted National Hockey League players